Megan Grano is an actress and writer from Grosse Pointe, Michigan, known for her work in This Is 40 (2012), Veep (2012) and Jimmy Kimmel Live! (2003).

Life
Megan Grano began performing as a member of Second Suburb, her sketch comedy troupe at high school. At her first year in University of North Carolina (where she studied Journalism) in 1995, she founded another comedy troupe named Chapel Hill Players (CHiPs). After moving to Chicago when she traveled after college, studied, performed, and taught improv and sketch at iO, the Annoyance, and many other small theaters. For 3 years, she toured with The Second City National Touring Company and wrote an original show with the cast of Second City's Girls' Night Out before joining the Second City in 2008.

In Los Angeles, she has worked extensively as an actress, writer, and coach. She has appeared and worked on numerous TV shows and films including Bridesmaids and This Is 40, worked on the writing staff on Jimmy Kimmel Live!, and performed with Jim Belushi and the Board of Comedy as well as locally in Los Angeles with various independent groups.

She appeared in the 2007 U.S. Comedy Arts Festival in Aspen with her sketch show The Ragdolls: MOIST and, also in 2007, won The Oxygen Network's National "Create a Series" Webisode Competition. In 2011, she started to work at The BreakWomb as a co-founder.

In 2015, she was listed as one of BBC's 100 Women.

Works

TV
 Weeds
 Parks and Recreation
 Hot in Cleveland
 Family Guy
 The Mindy Project
 American Dad!
 The Tonight Show with Conan O'Brien
 The Great State of Georgia

Filmography
 Bridesmaids
 This Is 40

Stage
 Thunderpussy (Annoyance Theatre)
 GrabAss (Annoyance Theatre)
 Armando Diaz (iO Theater)
 Virgin Daiquiri (iO Theater)
 The Second City Chicago
 U.S. Comedy Arts Festival
 iO Chicago
 iO West

References

External links
 
 
 

Living people
20th-century American actresses
21st-century American actresses
Actresses from Michigan
American film actresses
American stage actresses
American television actresses
American voice actresses
People from Grosse Pointe, Michigan
1970s births
BBC 100 Women